The American Consul is a 1917 American drama silent film directed by Rollin S. Sturgeon and written by Thomas J. Geraghty, Harvey F. Thew and Paul West. The film stars Theodore Roberts, Ernest Joy, Maude Fealy, Charles West, Raymond Hatton and Tom Forman. The film was released on February 15, 1917, by Paramount Pictures.

Plot

Cast 
Theodore Roberts as Abel Manning
Ernest Joy as Senator James Kitwell
Maude Fealy as Joan Kitwell
Charles West as Pedro Gonzales
Raymond Hatton as President Cavillo
Tom Forman as Geoffrey Daniels

Preservation status
Copies are preserved in the Library of Congress collection Packard Campus for Audio-Visual Conservation and the British Film and Television Archive, London.

References

External links 
 

1917 films
1910s English-language films
Silent American drama films
1917 drama films
Paramount Pictures films
American black-and-white films
American silent feature films
Films directed by Rollin S. Sturgeon
1910s American films